"C'est Magnifique" ("It's Magnificent") is a 1953 popular song written by Cole Porter for his 1953 musical Can-Can, where it was introduced by Lilo and Peter Cookson. The song become a standard. The only version to chart was by Gordon MacRae which reached No. 29 for one week.

In the 1960 film of Can-Can, the song was performed by Frank Sinatra and Shirley Maclaine.

Other notable versions
 Bing Crosby - included in the album El Señor Bing (1960)
 Ella Fitzgerald - Ella Loves Cole (1972)
 Dean Martin - for his album French Style (1962)
 Frank Sinatra - included in Can-Can Original Soundtrack album (1960)
 Kay Starr - for her album Movin' on Broadway (1960)
 Peggy Lee - included in her album Latin ala Lee! (1960)

References

Songs written by Cole Porter
Songs from Can-Can (musical)
Ella Fitzgerald songs
1953 songs
Songs from Can-Can (film)
Songs written for films